Great Love Themes is an album recorded in April 1966 by jazz saxophonist Julian Edwin "Cannonball" Adderley. It was released on the Capitol label featuring performances of Broadway show tunes by Cannonball Adderley with Nat Adderley, Joe Zawinul, Herbie Lewis and Roy McCurdy. AllMusic awarded the album 1 star.

Track listing
 "Somewhere" (Leonard Bernstein) -    
 "The Song Is You" (Jerome Kern, Oscar Hammerstein II) -    
 "Autumn Leaves" (Joseph Kosma, Johnny Mercer) -    
 "I Concentrate on You" (Cole Porter) -    
 "This Can´t Be Love" (Richard Rodgers, Lorenz Hart) -    
 "Stella By Starlight" (Victor Young, Ned Washington) -    
 "Morning of the Carnival (Manhã de Carnaval)" (Luis Bonfá, Antônio Maria) -    
 "The End of a Love Affair" (Edward C. Redding) -    
 "So In Love" (Porter) -  
Recorded in New York City, NY, on April 6 (tracks 1, 3 & 6-8) and April 7 (tracks 2, 4, 5 & 9), 1966

Personnel
Cannonball Adderley - alto saxophone
Nat Adderley - cornet
Joe Zawinul - piano
Herbie Lewis - bass
Roy McCurdy - drums
Unidentified strings
Ray Ellis - conductor, arranger

References

1966 albums
Capitol Records albums
Cannonball Adderley albums
Albums conducted by Ray Ellis
Albums arranged by Ray Ellis